

Events

Pre-1600
484 BC – Dedication of the Temple of Castor and Pollux in ancient Rome
70 – First Jewish–Roman War: Titus and his armies breach the walls of Jerusalem. (17th of Tammuz in the Hebrew calendar).
 756 – An Lushan Rebellion: Emperor Xuanzong of Tang is ordered by his Imperial Guards to execute chancellor Yang Guozhong by forcing him to commit suicide or face a mutiny. General An Lushan has other members of the emperor's family killed.
1099 – First Crusade: Christian soldiers take the Church of the Holy Sepulchre in Jerusalem after the final assault of a difficult siege.
1149 – The reconstructed Church of the Holy Sepulchre is consecrated in Jerusalem.
1207 – King John of England expels Canterbury monks for supporting Archbishop Stephen Langton.
1240 – Swedish–Novgorodian Wars: A Novgorodian army led by Alexander Nevsky defeats the Swedes in the Battle of the Neva.
1381 – John Ball, a leader in the Peasants' Revolt, is hanged, drawn and quartered in the presence of King Richard II of England.
1410 – Polish–Lithuanian–Teutonic War: Battle of Grunwald: The allied forces of the Kingdom of Poland and the Grand Duchy of Lithuania defeat the army of the Teutonic Order.
1482 – Muhammad XII is crowned the twenty-second and last Nasrid king of Granada.

1601–1900
1640 – The first university of Finland, the Royal Academy of Turku, is inaugurated in Turku.
1738 – Baruch Laibov and Alexander Voznitzin are burned alive in St. Petersburg, Russia. Vonitzin had converted to Judaism with Laibov's help, with the consent of Empress Anna Ivanovna.
1741 – Aleksei Chirikov sights land in Southeast Alaska. He sends men ashore in a longboat, making them the first Europeans to visit Alaska.
1789 – French Revolution: Gilbert du Motier, Marquis de Lafayette, is named by acclamation Colonel General of the new National Guard of Paris.
1799 – The Rosetta Stone is found in the Egyptian village of Rosetta by French Captain Pierre-François Bouchard during Napoleon's Egyptian Campaign.
1806 – Pike Expedition: United States Army Lieutenant Zebulon Pike begins an expedition from Fort Bellefontaine near St. Louis, Missouri,  to explore the west.
1815 – Napoleonic Wars: Napoleon Bonaparte surrenders aboard .
1823 – A fire destroys the ancient Basilica of Saint Paul Outside the Walls in Rome, Italy.
1834 – The Spanish Inquisition is officially disbanded after nearly 356 years.
1838 – Ralph Waldo Emerson delivers the Divinity School Address at Harvard Divinity School, discounting Biblical miracles and declaring Jesus a great man, but not God. The Protestant community reacts with outrage.
1862 – American Civil War: The CSS Arkansas, the most effective ironclad on the Mississippi River, battles with Union Navy ships commanded by Admiral David Farragut, severely damaging three ships and sustaining heavy damage herself. The encounter changed the complexion of warfare on the Mississippi and helped reverse Rebel's fortunes on the river in the summer of 1862.
1870 – Reconstruction Era of the United States: Georgia becomes the last of the former Confederate states to be readmitted to the Union.
  1870   – Canadian Confederation: Rupert's Land and the North-Western Territory are transferred to Canada from the Hudson's Bay Company, and the province of Manitoba and the Northwest Territories are established from these vast territories.
1888 – The stratovolcano Mount Bandai erupts, killing approximately 500 people in Fukushima Prefecture, Japan.

1901–present
1910 – In his book Clinical Psychiatry, Emil Kraepelin gives a name to Alzheimer's disease, naming it after his colleague Alois Alzheimer.
1916 – In Seattle, Washington, William Boeing and George Conrad Westervelt incorporate Pacific Aero Products (later renamed Boeing).
1918 – World War I: The Second Battle of the Marne begins near the River Marne with a German attack.
1920 – Aftermath of World War I: The Parliament of Poland establishes Silesian Voivodeship before the Polish-German plebiscite.
1922 – The Japanese Communist Party is established in Japan. 
1927 – Massacre of July 15, 1927: Eighty-nine protesters are killed by Austrian police in Vienna.
1941 – The Holocaust: Nazi Germany begins the deportation of 100,000 Jews from the occupied Netherlands to extermination camps.
1946 – The State of North Borneo, now Sabah, Malaysia, is annexed by the United Kingdom.
1954 – The Boeing 367-80, the prototype for both the Boeing 707 and C-135 series, takes its first flight.
1955 – Eighteen Nobel laureates sign the Mainau Declaration against nuclear weapons, later co-signed by thirty-four others.
1959 – The steel strike of 1959 begins, leading to significant importation of foreign steel for the first time in United States history.
1966 – Vietnam War: The United States and South Vietnam begin Operation Hastings to push the North Vietnamese out of the Vietnamese Demilitarized Zone.
1971 – The United Red Army is founded in Japan.
1974 – In Nicosia, Cyprus, Greek junta-sponsored nationalists launch a coup d'état, deposing President Makarios and installing Nikos Sampson as Cypriot president.
1975 – Space Race: Apollo–Soyuz Test Project features the dual launch of an Apollo spacecraft and a Soyuz spacecraft on the first joint Soviet-United States human-crewed flight. It was the last launch of both an Apollo spacecraft, and the Saturn family of rockets.
1979 – U.S. President Jimmy Carter gives his "malaise speech".
1983 – An attack at Orly Airport in Paris is launched by Armenian militant organisation ASALA, leaving eight people dead and 55 injured.
1996 – A Belgian Air Force C-130 Hercules carrying the Royal Netherlands Army marching band crashes on landing at Eindhoven Airport.
1998 – Sri Lankan Civil War: Sri Lankan Tamil MP S. Shanmuganathan is killed by a claymore mine.
2002 – "American Taliban" John Walker Lindh pleads guilty to supplying aid to the enemy and possession of explosives during the commission of a felony.
  2002   – The Anti-Terrorism Court of Pakistan sentences British born Ahmed Omar Saeed Sheikh to death, and three others suspected of murdering The Wall Street Journal reporter Daniel Pearl to life.
2003 – AOL Time Warner disbands Netscape. The Mozilla Foundation is established on the same day.
2006 – Twitter, later one of the largest social media platforms in the world, is launched.
2009 – Caspian Airlines Flight 7908 crashes near Jannatabad, Qazvin, Iran, killing 168.
2012 – South Korean rapper Psy releases his hit single Gangnam Style.
2014 – A train derails on the Moscow Metro, killing at least 24 and injuring more than 160 others.
2016 – Factions of the Turkish Armed Forces attempt a coup.
2018 – France win their second World Cup title, defeating Croatia 4-2.
2021 – Three people are killed by a distracted driver in the 2021 Bowburn crash.

Births

Pre-1600
 980 – Ichijō, Japanese emperor (d. 1011)
1273 – Ewostatewos, Ethiopian monk and saint (d. 1352)
1353 – Vladimir the Bold, Russian prince (d. 1410)
1359 – Antonio Correr, Italian cardinal (d. 1445)
1442 – Boček IV of Poděbrady, Bohemian nobleman (d. 1496)
1455 – Queen Yun, Korean queen (d. 1482)
1471 – Eskender, Ethiopian emperor (d. 1494)
1478 – Barbara Jagiellon, duchess consort of Saxony and Margravine consort of Meissen (d. 1534)
1573 – Inigo Jones, English architect, designed the Queen's House (d. 1652)
1600 – Jan Cossiers, Flemish painter (d. 1671)

1601–1900
1606 – Rembrandt, Dutch painter and etcher (d. 1669)
1611 – Jai Singh I, maharaja of Jaipur (d. 1667)
1613 – Gu Yanwu, Chinese philologist and geographer (d. 1682)
1631 – Jens Juel, Danish politician and diplomat, Governor-general of Norway (d. 1700)
  1631   – Richard Cumberland, English philosopher (d. 1718)
1638 – Giovanni Buonaventura Viviani, Italian violinist and composer (d. 1693)
1704 – August Gottlieb Spangenberg, German bishop and theologian (d. 1792)
1779 – Clement Clarke Moore, American author, poet, and educator (d. 1863)
1793 – Almira Hart Lincoln Phelps, American educator, author, editor (d. 1884)
1796 – Thomas Bulfinch, American mythologist (d. 1867)
1799 – Reuben Chapman, American lawyer and politician, 13th Governor of Alabama (d. 1882)
1800 – Sidney Breese, American jurist and politician (d. 1878)
1808 – Henry Edward Manning, English cardinal (d. 1892)
1812 – James Hope-Scott, English lawyer and academic (d. 1873)
1817 – Sir John Fowler, 1st Baronet, English engineer, designed the Forth Bridge (d. 1898)
1827 – W. W. Thayer American lawyer and politician, 6th Governor of Oregon (d. 1899)
1848 – Vilfredo Pareto, Italian economist and sociologist (d. 1923)
1850 – Frances Xavier Cabrini, Italian-American nun and saint (d. 1917)
1852 – Josef Josephi, Polish-born singer and actor (d. 1920)
1858 – Emmeline Pankhurst, English political activist and suffragist (d. 1928)
1864 – Marie Tempest, English actress and singer (d. 1942)
1865 – Alfred Harmsworth, 1st Viscount Northcliffe, Anglo-Irish businessman and publisher, founded the Amalgamated Press (d. 1922)
  1865   – Wilhelm Wirtinger, Austrian-German mathematician and theorist (d. 1945)
1867 – Jean-Baptiste Charcot, French physician and explorer (d. 1936)
1871 – Doppo Kunikida, Japanese journalist, author, and poet (d. 1908)
1880 – Enrique Mosca, Argentinian lawyer and politician (d. 1950)
1883 – Denny Barry Irish Hunger Striker (d. 1923)
1887 – Wharton Esherick, American sculptor (d. 1970)
1892 – Walter Benjamin, German philosopher and critic (d. 1940)
1893 – Enid Bennett, Australian-American actress (d. 1969)
  1893   – Dick Rauch, American football player and coach (d. 1970)
1894 – Tadeusz Sendzimir, Polish-American engineer (d. 1989)
1899 – Seán Lemass, Irish soldier and politician, 4th Taoiseach of Ireland (d. 1971)

1901–present
1902 – Jean Rey, Belgian lawyer and politician, 2nd President of the European Commission (d. 1983)
1903 – Walter D. Edmonds, American journalist and author (d. 1998)
  1903   – K. Kamaraj, Indian journalist and politician (d. 1975)
1904 – Rudolf Arnheim, German-American psychologist and author (d. 2007)
1905 – Dorothy Fields, American songwriter (d. 1974)
  1905   – Anita Farra, Italian actress (d. 2008)
1906 – R. S. Mugali, Indian poet and academic (d. 1993)
  1906   – Rudolf Uhlenhaut, English-German engineer (d. 1989)
1909 – Jean Hamburger, French physician and surgeon (d. 1992)
1911 – Edward Shackleton, Baron Shackleton, English geographer and politician, Secretary of State for Air (d. 1994)
1913 – Cowboy Copas, American singer-songwriter and guitarist (d. 1963)
  1913   – Hammond Innes, English journalist and author (d. 1998)
  1913   – Abraham Sutzkever, Russian poet and author (d. 2010)
1914 – Birabongse Bhanudej, Thai racing driver and sailor, member of the Thai royal family (d. 1985)
  1914   – Akhtar Hameed Khan, Pakistani economist, scholar, and activist (d. 1999)
  1914   – Howard Vernon, Swiss-French actor (d. 1996)
1915 – Albert Ghiorso, American chemist and academic (d. 2010)
  1915   – Kashmir Singh Katoch, Indian army officer (d. 2007)
1916 – Sumner Gerard, American politician and diplomat (d. 2005)
1917 – Robert Conquest, English-American historian, poet, and academic (d. 2015)
  1917   – Joan Roberts, American actress and singer (d. 2012)
  1917   – Nur Muhammad Taraki, Afghan journalist and politician (d. 1979)
1918 – Bertram Brockhouse, Canadian physicist and academic, Nobel Prize laureate (d. 2003)
  1918   – Brenda Milner, English-Canadian neuropsychologist and academic
1919 – Fritz Langanke, German lieutenant (d. 2012)
  1919   – Iris Murdoch, Anglo-Irish British novelist and philosopher (d. 1999)
1921 – Henri Colpi, Swiss-French director and screenwriter (d. 2006)
  1921   – Robert Bruce Merrifield, American biochemist and academic, Nobel Prize laureate (d. 2006)
1922 – Leon M. Lederman, American physicist and mathematician, Nobel Prize laureate (d. 2018)
  1922   – Jean-Pierre Richard, French writer (d. 2019)
1923 – Francisco de Andrade, Portuguese sailor
1924 – Jeremiah Denton, American admiral and politician (d. 2014)
  1924   – Marianne Bernadotte, Swedish actress and philanthropist
1925 – Philip Carey, American actor (d. 2009)
  1925   – Taylor Hardwick, American architect, designed Haydon Burns Library and Friendship Fountain Park (d. 2014)
  1925   – D. A. Pennebaker, American documentary filmmaker (d. 2019)
  1925   – Evan Hultman, American politician
  1925   – Antony Carbone, American actor (d. 2020)
  1925   – Pandel Savic, American football player (d. 2018)
1926 – Driss Chraïbi, Moroccan-French journalist and author (d. 2007)
  1926   – Leopoldo Galtieri, Argentinian general and politician, 44th President of Argentina (d. 2003)
  1926   – Raymond Gosling, English physicist and academic (d. 2015)
  1926   – Sir John Graham, 4th Baronet, English diplomat (d. 2019)
1927 – Nan Martin, American actress (d. 2010)
  1927   – Carmen Zapata, American actress (d. 2014)
  1927   – Håkon Brusveen, Norwegian cross-country skier (d. 2021)
1928 – Carl Woese, American microbiologist and biophysicist (d. 2012)
  1928   – Viramachaneni Vimla Devi, Indian parliamentarian (d. 1967)
1929 – Charles Anthony, American tenor and actor (d. 2012)
  1929   – Francis Bebey, Cameroonian-French guitarist (d. 2001)
  1929   – Ian Stewart, Scottish racing driver (d. 2017)
1930 – Jacques Derrida, Algerian-French philosopher and academic (d. 2004)
  1930   – Richard Garneau, Canadian journalist and sportscaster (d. 2013)
  1930   – Stephen Smale, American mathematician and computer scientist
  1930   – Einosuke Akiya, Japanese Buddhist leader
1931 – Clive Cussler, American archaeologist and author (d. 2020)
  1931   – Joanna Merlin, American actress and casting director
  1931   – Jacques-Yvan Morin, Canadian lawyer and politician, Deputy Premier of Quebec
1932 – Ed Litzenberger, Canadian ice hockey player (d. 2010)
1933 – Guido Crepax, Italian author and illustrator (d. 2003)
  1933   – M. T. Vasudevan Nair, Indian author and screenwriter
1934 – Harrison Birtwistle, English composer and academic (d. 2022)
  1934   – Eva Krížiková, Czech actress (d. 2020)
  1934   – Risto Jarva, Finnish director and producer (d. 1977)
1935 – Donn Clendenon, American baseball player and lawyer (d. 2005)
  1935   – Alex Karras, American football player, wrestler, and actor (d. 2012)
  1935   – Ken Kercheval, American actor and director (d. 2019)
1936 – George Voinovich, American lawyer and politician, 65th Governor of Ohio (d. 2016)
1937 – Prabhash Joshi, Indian journalist (d. 2009)
1938 – Bill Alsup, American racing driver (d. 2016)
  1938   – Ernie Barnes, American football player, actor, and painter (d. 2009)
  1938   – Carmen Callil, Australian publisher, founded Virago Press
  1938   – Barry Goldwater, Jr., American lawyer and politician
1939 – Aníbal Cavaco Silva, Portuguese economist and politician, 19th President of the Portuguese Republic
1940 – Chris Cord, American racing driver
  1940   – Denis Héroux, Canadian director and producer (d. 2015)
  1940   – Ronald Gene Simmons, American sergeant and convicted murderer (d. 1990)
  1940   – Robert Winston, English surgeon, academic, and politician
1942 – Vivian Malone Jones, American civil rights activist (d. 2005)
1943 – Jocelyn Bell Burnell, Northern Irish astrophysicist, astronomer, and academic
1944 – Millie Jackson, American singer-songwriter
1945 – Jan-Michael Vincent, American actor (d. 2019)
  1945   – David Arthur Granger, Guyanese politician, 9th President of Guyana
  1945   – Peter Lewis, American singer-songwriter and guitarist 
  1945   – Jürgen Möllemann, German soldier and politician, Vice-Chancellor of Germany (d. 2003)
1946 – Linda Ronstadt, American singer-songwriter, producer, and actress
  1946   – Hassanal Bolkiah, Sultan of Brunei
1947 – Lydia Davis, American short story writer, novelist, and essayist
  1947   – Pridiyathorn Devakula, Thai economist and politician, Thai Minister of Finance
  1947   – Roky Erickson, American singer-songwriter and musician (d. 2019)
1948 – Twinkle, English singer-songwriter (d. 2015)
  1948   – Dimosthenis Kourtovik, Greek anthropologist and critic
  1948   – Artimus Pyle, American rock drummer and songwriter
1949 – Carl Bildt, Swedish politician and diplomat, Prime Minister of Sweden
  1949   – Trevor Horn, English singer-songwriter, keyboard player, and producer 
  1949   – Richard Russo, American novelist, short story writer, and screenwriter
1950 – Colin Barnett, Australian economist and politician, 29th Premier of Western Australia
  1950   – Arianna Huffington, Greek-American journalist and publisher
1951 – Gregory Isaacs, Jamaican-English singer-songwriter (d. 2010)
  1951   – Jesse Ventura, American wrestler, actor, and politician, 38th Governor of Minnesota
1952 – John Cleland, British racing driver
  1952   – Celia Imrie, English actress
  1952   – Terry O'Quinn, American actor
  1952   – David Pack, American singer-songwriter, guitarist, and producer
  1952   – Marky Ramone, American drummer and songwriter 
  1952   – Johnny Thunders, American singer-songwriter and guitarist (d. 1991)
1953 – Jean-Bertrand Aristide, Haitian priest and politician, 49th President of Haiti
  1953   – Sultanah Haminah, Malaysian royal consort
  1953   – Mohamad Shahrum Osman, Malaysian politician
  1953   – Alicia Bridges, American singer-songwriter
1954 – John Ferguson, Australian rugby league player
  1954   – Giorgos Kaminis, American-Greek lawyer and politician, 78th Mayor of Athens
  1954   – Mario Kempes, Argentinian footballer and manager
1956 – Ashoke Sen, Indian theoretical physicist and string theorist
  1956   – Ian Curtis, English singer-songwriter and guitarist (d. 1980)
  1956   – Nicholas Harberd, British botanist, educator, and academician 
  1956   – Barry Melrose, Canadian ice hockey player, coach, and sportscaster
  1956   – Steve Mortimer, Australian rugby league player, coach, and administrator
  1956   – Joe Satriani, American singer-songwriter and guitarist 
  1956   – Wayne Taylor, South African racing driver
1958 – Gary Heale, English footballer and coach
  1958   – Mac Thornberry, American lawyer and politician
1959 – Vincent Lindon, French actor, director, and screenwriter
1961 – Lolita Davidovich, Canadian actress
  1961   – Jean-Christophe Grangé, French journalist and screenwriter
  1961   – Forest Whitaker, American actor
1962 – Nikos Filippou, Greek basketball player and manager
  1962   – Michelle Ford, Australian swimmer
1963 – Brigitte Nielsen, Danish-Italian actress
  1963   – Steve Thomas, English-Canadian ice hockey player and coach
1965 – Alistair Carmichael, Scottish lawyer and politician, Secretary of State for Scotland
  1965   – Gero Miesenböck, Austrian neuroscientist and educator
  1965   – David Miliband, English politician, Secretary of State for Foreign and Commonwealth Affairs
1966 – Jason Bonham, English singer-songwriter and drummer
  1966   – Irène Jacob, French-Swiss actress
1967 – Adam Savage, American actor and special effects designer
  1967   – Elbert West, American singer-songwriter (d. 2015)
1968 – Eddie Griffin, American comedian, actor, and producer
1969 – Ain Tammus, Estonian footballer and coach
1970 – Tarkan Gözübüyük, Turkish bass player and producer
1972 – Scott Foley, American actor
1973 – Brian Austin Green, American actor
1975 – Cherry, American wrestler and manager
  1975   – Danny Law, English cricketer
  1975   – Ben Pepper, Australian basketball player
1976 – Steve Cunningham, American boxer
  1976   – Marco Di Vaio, Italian footballer
  1976   – Diane Kruger, German actress and model
  1976   – Gabriel Iglesias, Mexican-American comedian and voice actor
1977 – D. J. Kennington, Canadian racing driver 
  1977   – André Nel, South African cricketer
  1977   – Lana Parrilla, American actress
  1977   – John St. Clair, American football player
  1977   – Ray Toro, American singer-songwriter and guitarist
1978 – Miguel Olivo, Dominican baseball player
1979 – Laura Benanti, American actress and singer
  1979   – Alexander Frei, Swiss footballer
  1979   – Edda Garðarsdóttir, Icelandic footballer
  1979   – Renata Kučerová, Czech tennis player
1980 – Reggie Abercrombie, American baseball player
  1980   – Jonathan Cheechoo, Canadian ice hockey player
  1980   – Julia Perez, Indonesian singer and actress (d. 2017)
1981 – Alou Diarra, French footballer
  1981   – Petros Klampanis, Greek bassist and composer
  1981   – Marius Stankevičius, Lithuanian footballer
1982 – Julien Canal, French racing driver
  1982   – Alan Pérez, Spanish cyclist
  1982   – Neemia Tialata, New Zealand rugby player
  1982   – Aída Yéspica, Venezuelan model and actress
1983 – Salvatore Iovino, American racing driver 
  1983   – Nelson Merlo, Brazilian racing driver
  1983   – Will Rudge, English cricketer 
  1983   – Heath Slater, American wrestler
1984 – Angelo Siniscalchi, Italian footballer
  1984   – Veronika Velez-Zuzulová, Slovak skier
1986 – Tyler Kennedy, Canadian ice hockey player
1989 – Steven Jahn, German footballer
  1989   – Alisa Kleybanova, Russian tennis player
  1989   – Anthony Randolph, American basketball player
1990 – Zach Bogosian, American ice hockey player
  1990   – Damian Lillard, American basketball player
  1990   – Tyler Young, American racing driver
1991 – Danilo, Brazilian footballer
  1991   – Derrick Favors, American basketball player
  1991   – Evgeny Tishchenko, Russian boxer
  1991   – Nuria Párrizas Díaz, Spanish tennis player
1992 – Tobias Harris, American basketball player
  1992   – Wayde van Niekerk, South African sprinter
1993 – Håvard Nielsen, Norwegian footballer
  1993   – Harrison Rhodes, American racing driver
1996 – Vivianne Miedema, Dutch football player
1997 – Jil Teichmann, Swiss tennis player
1998 – Noah Gragson, American racing driver
2008 – Iain Armitage, American child actor

Deaths

Pre-1600
 756 – Yang Guifei, consort of Xuan Zong (b. 719)
 998 – Abū al-Wafā' Būzjānī, Persian mathematician and astronomer (b. 940)
1015 – Vladimir the Great, Grand prince of Kievan Rus' (b. c. 958)
1274 – Bonaventure, Italian bishop and saint (b. 1221)
1291 – Rudolf I of Germany (b. 1218)
1299 – King Eric II of Norway (b. c. 1268)
1381 – John Ball, English Lollard priest
1388 – Agnes of Durazzo, titular Latin empress consort of Constantinople (d. 1313)
1397 – Catherine of Henneberg, German ruler (b. c. 1334)
1406 – William, Duke of Austria
1410 – Ulrich von Jungingen, German Grand Master of the Teutonic Knights (b. 1360)
1445 – Joan Beaufort, Queen of Scotland
1542 – Lisa del Giocondo, subject of Leonardo da Vinci's painting Mona Lisa (b. 1479)
1544 – René of Châlon (b. 1519)
1571 – Shimazu Takahisa, Japanese daimyō (b. 1514)

1601–1900
1609 – Annibale Carracci, Italian painter and illustrator (b. 1560)
1614 – Pierre de Bourdeille, seigneur de Brantôme, French soldier, historian, and author (b. 1540)
1655 – Girolamo Rainaldi, Italian architect (b. 1570)
1685 – James Scott, 1st Duke of Monmouth, Dutch-English general and politician, Governor of Kingston-upon-Hull (b. 1649)
1750 – Vasily Tatishchev, Russian ethnographer and politician (b. 1686)
1765 – Charles-André van Loo, French painter (b. 1705)
1767 – Michael Bruce, Scottish poet and composer (b. 1746)
1789 – Jacques Duphly, French harpsichord player and composer (b. 1715)
1828 – Jean-Antoine Houdon, French sculptor (b. 1741)
1839 – Winthrop Mackworth Praed, English poet and politician (b. 1802)
1844 – Claude Charles Fauriel, French philologist and historian (b. 1772)
1851 – Anne-Marie Javouhey, French nun, founder of the Sisters of St Joseph of Cluny (b. 1779)
  1851   – Juan Felipe Ibarra, Argentinian general and politician (b. 1787)
1857 – Carl Czerny, Austrian pianist and composer (b. 1791)
1858 – Alexander Andreyevich Ivanov, Russian painter (b. 1806)
1883 – General Tom Thumb, American circus performer (b. 1838)
1885 – Rosalía de Castro, Spanish author and poet (b. 1837)
1890 – Gottfried Keller, Swiss author, poet, and playwright (b. 1819)
1898 – Jean-Baptiste Salpointe, French-American archbishop (d. 1825)

1901–present
1904 – Anton Chekhov, Russian playwright and short story writer (b. 1860)
1919 – Hermann Emil Fischer, German chemist and academic, Nobel Prize laureate (b. 1852)
1929 – Hugo von Hofmannsthal, Austrian author, poet, and playwright (b. 1874)
1930 – Leopold Auer, Hungarian violinist, composer, and conductor (b. 1845)
  1930   – Leonora Barry, Irish-born American social activist (b. 1849)
1931 – Ladislaus Bortkiewicz, Russian-German economist and mathematician (b. 1868)
1932 – Bahíyyih Khánum, Iranian writer and leader in the Baha'i faith (b. 1846)  
  1932   – Cornelis Jacobus Langenhoven, South African poet and politician (b. 1873)
1933 – Irving Babbitt, American scholar, critic, and academic (b. 1865)
  1933   – Freddie Keppard, American cornet player (b. 1890)
1940 – Eugen Bleuler, Swiss psychiatrist and physician (b. 1857)
  1940   – Robert Wadlow, American giant, 8"11' 271 cm (b.1918)
1942 – Wenceslao Vinzons, Filipino lawyer and politician (b. 1910)
1944 – Marie-Victorin Kirouac, Canadian botanist and academic (b. 1885)
1946 – Razor Smith, English cricketer and coach (b. 1877)
1947 – Walter Donaldson, American soldier and songwriter (b. 1893)
1948 – John J. Pershing, American general (b. 1860)
1953 – Geevarghese Mar Ivanios, Indian archbishop, founded the Order of the Imitation of Christ (b. 1882)
1957 – James M. Cox, American publisher and politician, 46th Governor of Ohio (b. 1870)
  1957   – Vasily Maklakov, a Russian lawyer and politician (b. 1869)
1959 – Ernest Bloch, Swiss-American composer and academic (b. 1880)
  1959   – Vance Palmer, Australian author and critic (b. 1885)
1960 – Set Persson, Swedish politician (b. 1897)
  1960   – Lawrence Tibbett, American singer and actor (b. 1896)
1961 – John Edward Brownlee, Canadian lawyer and politician, 5th Premier of Alberta (b. 1884)
  1961   – Nina Bari, Russian mathematician (b. 1901)
1965 – Francis Cherry, American lawyer and politician, 35th Governor of Arkansas (b. 1908)
1966 – Seyfi Arkan, Turkish architect (b. 1903)
1969 – Grace Hutchins, American labor reformer and researcher (b. 1885)
1974 – Christine Chubbuck, American journalist (b. 1944)
1976 – Paul Gallico, American journalist and author (b. 1897)
1977 – Donald Mackay, Australian businessman and activist (b. 1933)
1979 – Gustavo Díaz Ordaz, Mexican academic and politician, 29th President of Mexico (b. 1911)
1981 – Frédéric Dorion, Canadian lawyer, judge, and politician (b. 1898)
1982 – Bill Justis, American saxophonist, songwriter, and producer (b. 1926)
1986 – Billy Haughton, American harness racer and trainer (b. 1923)
1988 – Eleanor Estes, American librarian, author, and illustrator (b. 1906)
1989 – Laurie Cunningham, English footballer (b. 1956)
1990 – Zaim Topčić, Yugoslav and Bosnian writer (b. 1920)
  1990   – Margaret Lockwood, English actress (b. 1916)
  1990   – Omar Abu Risha, Syrian poet and diplomat, 4th Syrian Ambassador to the United States (b. 1910)
1991 – Bert Convy, American actor, singer, and game show host (b. 1933)
1992 – Hammer DeRoburt, Nauruan educator and politician, 1st President of Nauru (b. 1922)
  1992   – Chingiz Mustafayev, Azerbaijani journalist and author (b. 1960)
1997 – Justinas Lagunavičius, Lithuanian basketball player (b. 1924)
  1997   – Gianni Versace, Italian fashion designer, founded Versace (b. 1946)
1998 – S. Shanmuganathan, Sri Lankan politician (b. 1960)
2000 – Louis Quilico, Canadian opera singer and educator (b. 1925)
2001 – C. Balasingham, Sri Lankan lawyer and civil servant (b. 1917)
2003 – Roberto Bolaño, Chilean novelist, short-story writer, poet, and essayist (b. 1953)
  2003   – Elisabeth Welch, American actress and singer (b. 1904)
2006 – Robert H. Brooks, American businessman, founder of Hooters and Naturally Fresh, Inc. (b. 1937)
  2006   – Alireza Shapour Shahbazi, Iranian archaeologist and academic (b. 1942)
2008 – György Kolonics, Hungarian canoe racer (b. 1972)
2010 – James E. Akins, American politician and diplomat, United States Ambassador to Saudi Arabia (b. 1926)
2011 – Friedrich Wilhelm Schnitzler, German landowner and politician (b. 1928)  
  2011   – Googie Withers, British-Australian actress (b. 1917)
2012 – Boris Cebotari, Moldovan footballer (b. 1975)
  2012   – Tsilla Chelton, Israeli-French actress (b. 1919)
  2012   – Grant Feasel, American football player (b. 1960)
  2012   – David Fraser, English general (b. 1920)
  2012   – Celeste Holm, American actress and singer (b. 1917)
  2012   – Yoichi Takabayashi, Japanese director and screenwriter (b. 1931)
2013 – Ninos Aho, Syrian-American poet and activist (b. 1945)
  2013   – Henry Braden, American lawyer and politician (b. 1944)
  2013   – Tom Greenwell, American lawyer and judge (b. 1956)
  2013   – Earl Gros, American football player (b. 1940)
  2013   – Noël Lee, Chinese-American pianist and composer (b. 1924)
  2013   – Meskerem Legesse, Ethiopian runner (b. 1986)
  2013   – John T. Riedl, American computer scientist and academic (b. 1962)
2014 – Óscar Acosta, Honduran author, poet, and diplomat (b. 1933)
  2014   – James MacGregor Burns, American historian, political scientist, and author (b. 1918)
  2014   – Saúl Lara, Spanish footballer (b. 1982)
  2014   – Edward Perl, American neuroscientist and academic (b. 1926)
  2014   – Robert A. Roe, American soldier and politician (b. 1924)
2015 – Masahiko Aoki, Japanese-American economist and academic (b. 1938)
  2015   – Wan Li, Chinese politician, 4th Vice Premier of the People's Republic of China (b. 1916)
  2015   – Aubrey Morris, British actor (b. 1926)
  2015   – Dave Somerville, Canadian singer (b. 1933)
2017 – Martin Landau, American film and television actor (b. 1928)
2021 – Peter R. de Vries, Dutch investigative journalist and crime reporter (b. 1956)

Holidays and observances
Bon Festival (Kantō region, Japan)
Christian feast day:
Abhai (Syriac Orthodox Church)
Anne-Marie Javouhey
Bernhard II, Margrave of Baden-Baden
Bonaventure
Dispersion of the Apostles (formerly by the Catholic Church)
Donald of Ogilvy
Edith of Polesworth
Edith of Wilton
Henry II, Holy Roman Emperor
Plechelm
Quriaqos and Julietta (Eastern Orthodox, Oriental Orthodox)
Swithun 
Vladimir the Great (Eastern Orthodox; Catholic Church)
July 15 (Eastern Orthodox liturgics)
Earliest day on which Birthday of Don Luis Muñoz Rivera can fall, while July 21 is the latest; celebrated on the third Monday of July. (Puerto Rico)
Earliest day on which Galla Bayramy can fall, while July 21 is the latest; celebrated on the third Sunday of July. (Turkmenistan)
Earliest day on which Marine Day can fall, while July 21 is the latest; celebrated on the third Monday of July. (Japan)
Earliest day on which President's Day can fall, while July 21 is the latest; celebrated on the third Monday of July. (Botswana)
Elderly Men Day (Kiribati)
Festival of Santa Rosalia (Palermo, Sicily)
Sultan's Birthday (Brunei Darussalam)

References

External links

 
 
 

Days of the year
July